The People's Hospital of Guangxi Zhuang Autonomous Region is a large, comprehensive provincial 3A hospital and medical center of Guangxi Zhuang Autonomous Region, China, established in 1941. As a teaching hospital, it facilitates final year medical students from Guangxi Medical University, Guilin Medical University.

References 

Hospitals in Guangxi
Buildings and structures in Nanning
1941 establishments in China
Hospitals established in 1941